G String Divas is an American documentary series that aired on HBO. The show was filmed in 2000, and follows the lives of strippers working in a Bristol, Pennsylvania gentlemen's club.

Overview
The show has thirteen episodes and there were nine featured women: Miss Bunny, Jordan, Ginger, Cashmere, Joey, Chrissy, Silver, Summer and Angel.  The premiere episode delivered a 7.7 share, or 3.4 million viewers.  The show was produced and directed by Patti Kaplan, who also produced HBO's Real Sex series.  The club featured on it, Divas International Club, was attached to a hotel, and was converted to a banquet facility shortly after filming ended.

In one episode, the dancer Summer refers to a homicide case in which an obsessed customer killed his wife.  The killer, Craig Rabinowitz, had become obsessed with her when she was dancing at another Pennsylvania strip club.  The case was later profiled on an episode of Forensic Files, called "Summer Obsession", in which Miss Bunny, another of the performers from the HBO show, was interviewed.

References

External links
 "G String Divas" at HBO.com

HBO original programming
2000 American television series debuts
2000 American television series endings
2000s American documentary television series
Erotic dance
Bucks County, Pennsylvania
Documentary films about sexuality
English-language television shows